Events in the year 1923 in Japan. It corresponds to Taishō 12 (大正12年) in the Japanese calendar.

Incumbents
Emperor: Taishō
Regent: Hirohito
Prime Minister:
Katō Tomosaburō (until August 24)
Yamamoto Gonnohyōe (from September 2)

Governors
Aichi Prefecture: Hikoji Kawaguchi (until 16 June); Masahiro Ota (starting 16 June)
Akita Prefecture: Masao Kishimoto
Aomori Prefecture: Yujiro Ozaki (until 25 October); Kazue Baba (starting 25 October)
Ehime Prefecture: Juunosuke Miyazaki 
Fukui Prefecture: Josuke Shiraogawa 
Fukushima Prefecture: Iwata Mamoru (until 25 October); Kosaka Masayasu (starting 25 October)
Gifu Prefecture: Manpei Ueda 
Gunma Prefecture: Yamaoka Kunitoshi 
Hiroshima Prefecture: Kamehiko Abe (until 25 October); Jiro Yamagata (starting 25 October)
Ibaraki Prefecture: Genjiro Moriya (until 25 October); Shohei Fujinuma (starting 25 October)
Iwate Prefecture: Ushidzuka Torataro 
Kagawa Prefecture: Shuji Sasaki (until 25 October); Nakagawa Kenzo (starting 25 October)
Kanagawa Prefecture: Yasukouchi Asakichi 
Kochi Prefecture: Toyoji Obata (until 25 October); Fujioka Hyoichi (starting 25 October)
Kumamoto Prefecture: Tadahiko Okada (until 12 October); Chisato Tanaka (starting 12 October)
Kyoto Prefecture: Tokikazu Ikematsu 
Mie Prefecture: Saburo Shibata (until 25 October); Tago Ilman (starting 25 October)
Miyagi Prefecture: Yuichiro Chikaraishi 
Miyazaki Prefecture: Muneyoshi Oshiba (until 25 October); Saito Munenori (starting 25 October)
Nagano Prefecture: Toshio Honma
Niigata Prefecture: Ota Masahiro (until 11 June); Ohara Sanarata (starting 11 June)
Okayama Prefecture: Masao Kishimoto
Okinawa Prefecture: Jyun Wada (until 25 October); Ki Iwamoto (starting 25 October)
Saga Prefecture: Tominaga 
Saitama Prefecture: Horiuchi Hidetaro (until 25 October); Motoda Tashio (starting 25 October)'
Shiga Prefecture: Kaiichiro Suematsu (starting month unknown)
Shiname Prefecture: Sanehide Takarabe (until 25 October); Naganobu Ren (starting 25 October)
Tochigi Prefecture: Haruki Yamawaki
Tokyo: Katsuo Usami 
Toyama Prefecture: Kihachiro Ito 
Yamagata Prefecture: Agata Shinobu

Events

April unknown date – Yamanouchi Pharmaceutical was founded, as predecessor part of Astellas Pharma.
May 21–25 – 1923 Far Eastern Games held in Osaka.
August 24 – Prime Minister Katō Tomosaburō dies in office.
August 29 – Fuji Electric Manufacturing, later Fuji Electric was founded.
September 1 – The Great Kantō earthquake devastates Tokyo and Yokohama, killing an estimated 142,807 people, but according to a Japanese construction research center report in 2005, 105,000 are confirmed dead. Varied accounts indicate the duration of the earthquake was between four and ten minutes.
September 1-21 - Kantō Massacre: Young Japanese vigilante groups, driven by rumors of a Korean revolt, attack and murder thousands of Korean residents.
September 2
Yamamoto Gonnohyōe is appointed Prime Minister of Japan.
Martial law declared in Tokyo districts
September 3–5 – Kameido incident
September 4 – The area of martial law is expanded to cover all of Tokyo, Kanagawa, Chiba, and Saitama prefectures.
September 7 – A Curfew is issued in Tokyo.
September 16 – Amakasu Incident: The feminist Noe Itō and her partner, the anarchist Sakae Ōsugi are beaten and killed by a police squadron led by Lieutenant Amakasu Masahiko, along with Ōsugi's six-year-old nephew, and their bodies disposed in a well. Following countrywide outcry, Amakasu was court-martialed and sentenced to 10 years in prison.
December 27 – Toranomon Incident: An assassination attempt is made on the crown prince Hirohito in Tokyo by Daisuke Namba, but the attempt fails.
Unknown date –Yamanouchi Pharmacy, as predecessor of Astellas was founded.

Births
March 27 – Shūsaku Endō, writer (d. 1996)
May 24 – Seijun Suzuki, filmmaker, actor, and screenwriter (d. 2017)
June 4 – Yuriko, Princess Mikasa, wife of Prince Takahito
August 7 – Ryōtarō Shiba, writer (d. 1996)
October 7 – Tomio Aoki, film actor (d. 2004)

Deaths
January 8 – Shimamura Hayao, Marine Admiral (b. 1858)
February 3 – Kuroki Tamemoto general (b. 1844)
February 4 – Prince Fushimi Sadanaru, Field Marshal (b. 1858)
April 1 – Prince Naruhisa Kitashirakawa, military personnel (b. 1887)
June 9
Takeo Arishima, novelist, writer and essayist (suicide) (b. 1878)
Akiko Hatano, journalist (suicide) (b. 1894)
June 19 – Shō Shō, member of the House of Peers (b. 1888)
August 24 – Katō Tomosaburō, Prime Minister of Japan (b. 1861)
September 1 – Matsuoka Yasukowa, politician and cabinet minister (B. 1846)
September 2 – Kuriyagawa Hakuson, literary critic (b. 1880)
September 16
Noe Itō, anarchist, social critic and author (b. 1895)
Sakae Ōsugi, anarchist (b. 1885)
November 8 – Fusakichi Omori, seismologist (b. 1868)
November 26 – Otani Kikuzo, general (b. 1856)
December 29 – Kōno Hironaka, politician (b. 1849)

See also
List of Japanese films of the 1920s

References

 
1920s in Japan
Japan
Years of the 20th century in Japan